Jean-Marie Lucas de Peslouan, better known by his pseudonym Jean Lucas-Dubreton (23 September 1883 – 9 September 1972) was a French historian and biographer.

He was born in Grenoble. He died in Triel-sur-Seine.

Works
 Samuel Pepys: a portrait in miniature, London: A. M. Philpot, 1922. Translated by H. J. Stenning. 
 The restoration and the July monarchy. New York: G.P. Putnam's Sons. Translated by E. F. Buckley.
 The Borgias, 1954. Santa Clara, Calif., Peterson Engineering Co. Translated by Philip John Stead.
 Daily life in Florence in the time of the Medici, London: Allen & Unwin, 1960. Translated by A. Lytton Sells.

References

1883 births
1972 deaths
French biographers
French male non-fiction writers
20th-century French historians
20th-century French male writers